Yuan Shansong, sometimes called Yuan Song, was an official of the Jin Dynasty. He was known as an accomplished poet, lyricist, and also as an historian. Yuan also produced one of the first landscape essays, later to become a popular form in Chinese literature. He composed the Treatise on Administrative Geography   Jùnguózhì). Much of his work has survived to the present day. Later, Yuan was given appointment as the Grand Administrator of Wu Commandery. During the rebellion of Sun En in 399, he died defending Hudu in the western suburbs of modern Shanghai.

References

郡國志

399 deaths
Jin dynasty (266–420) poets
4th-century Chinese poets
Jin dynasty (266–420) politicians
Political office-holders in Jiangsu
Year of birth unknown
4th-century Chinese historians